Khold is a Norwegian black metal band formed in Oslo in 2000 after the split-up of Tulus. The band plays mid-paced black metal.

History 
Khold was formed in Oslo in 2000. A demo was recorded in late 2000, which caused Khold to be signed by Moonfog.

The first Khold album, Masterpiss of Pain, was released in 2001. Later in the year, Khold went touring in Europe to support the album.

Khold's second album, Phantom, was released in 2002.

In late 2003, Khold recorded their third album Mørke gravers kammer, and also made a music video for the song "Død". The album was released in 2004, through Candlelight Records.

Khold went on yet another Norwegian tour in 2005, and then recorded their fourth album, Krek, which was released on 10 October by Tabu Records.

Khold returned in 2008 with a new album, Hundre År Gammal, which was released on 9 June.

After returning to the live scene in 2011 at the Wacken Open Air festival Khold has been playing a couple of festivals each year.

In 2014, Khold released yet another critically acclaimed album entitled Til Endes and continue to perform at festivals throughout Europe and the US.

In June 2021, Khold signed to Soulseller Records and they are expected to release their first album in eight years in 2022.

Style

Lyrical style 

Drummer Sarke explained their lyrical style thus:

Our lyrics deal much about death and what surrounds death. Always the old way: sickness, mad people, ancient beliefs and so on. Hildr writes our lyrics and she does it very well. The reason we have Norwegian lyrics is because it fits our music better and gives us more inspiration to make dark, cold music.

Regarding the religious aspect often present in black metal, Sarke noted:

We are not into Jesus or whatever; we write our own stories. We can of course use the name God or Satan in our lyrics. If so, its just a part of a story. I can't understand why people still believe in that shit.

Musical style 

Khold play their music in a raw and primitive manner, using only guitar, bass guitar and drums. The lyrics are all written in ancient Norwegian, with the intention of enhancing the songs' concepts. Their music has been described as "black 'n' roll" by some.

Discography 

 Masterpiss of Pain (2001)
 Phantom (2002)
 Mørke gravers kammer (2004)
 Krek (2005)
 Hundre år gammal (2008)
 Til Endes (2014)
 Svartsyn (2022)

Personnel

Current line-up 

 Gard – vocals, guitar
 Rinn – guitar
 Crowbel – bass guitar (since 2013)
 Sarke – drums
 Hildr – lyrics

Former members 

 Eikind – bass guitar (2000–2002)
 Brandr – bass guitar (for a couple of gigs in 2002)
 Sir Graanug – bass guitar on the Phantom album
 Grimd – bass guitar from 2002 until 2012

References 

Norwegian black metal musical groups
Musical groups established in 2000
2000 establishments in Norway
Musical groups from Norway with local place of origin missing